Grégoire is both a surname and a given name. Notable people with the name include:

Surname / Family name
Alexandre Grégoire (1922–2001), Haitian painter
Antonina Grégoire (1914-1952), Belgian commercial engineer, feminist and communist, member of Belgian Partisans Armés resistance during the Second World War
Augustus Gregoire (1936–1972), Dominican cricketer
Christine Gregoire (born 1947), American Democratic governor of the state of Washington
Christophe Grégoire (born 1980), Belgian footballer
Gabriel Grégoire (born 1953), defensive lineman in the Canadian Football League
Gilles Grégoire (1926–2006), co-founder of the Parti Québécois
Henri Grégoire (1750–1831), French Roman Catholic priest, constitutional bishop of Blois and a revolutionary leader
Henri Grégoire (historian) (1881–1964), scholar of the Byzantine Empire
Jean-Albert Grégoire (1899–1992), pioneer of the front-wheel drive car
Jérémy Grégoire (1995), professional ice hockey player
Joseph-Ernest Grégoire (1886–1980), French Canadian politician
Marie Grégoire (born 1965), Canadian politician of Quebec
Oscar Grégoire (1877–1947), Belgian water polo player
Paul Grégoire (1911–1993), Canadian Archbishop of Montreal
,  (1915–1988), Dutch sculptor
Pierre Grégoire (c.1540–1597), French jurist and philosopher
Pierre Grégoire (1907–1991), Luxembourgian politician, journalist, and writer
Sophie Grégoire (born 1975), wife of Justin Trudeau
Stéphan Grégoire (born 1969), French race car driver

Given name
Grégoire (musician) (full name Grégoire Boissenot,; born 1979), French composer and singer-songwriter
Grégoire-Pierre Agagianian, leading prelate of the Armenian Catholic Church
Grégoire Aslan (1908–1982), Armenian actor
Grégoire Barrère (born 1994), French tennis player
Grégoire Bélanger (1889–1957), Canadian politician of Quebec
Gregoire Boonzaier (1909–2005), South African artist
Grégoire Bouillier (born 1960), French memoirist
Grégoire Colin (born 1975), French actor
Grégoire Kayibanda (192–1976), former President of Rwanda
Grégoire Laurent (1906–?), Luxembourgian boxer
Gregoire Maret (born 1975), Swiss musician
Grégoire Margotton (born 1969), French sports journalist
Grégoire De Mévius (born 1962), Belgian rally driver
Grégoire Mbida (born 1952), retired Cameroonian professional footballer
Grégoire Michonze (1902–1982), Russian-French painter
Gregoire Ndahimana (born 1952), Rwandan war criminal
Grégoire Orlyk (1702–1759), French military commander
Grégoire de Saint-Vincent (1584–1667), Flemish Jesuit mathematician
 (born 1964), Franco-German journalist, graphic designer, interpreter and internet activist

See also
Gregoire (chimpanzee), Africa's oldest known chimpanzee
Saint-Grégoire (disambiguation)

French masculine given names

ko:그레고리우스